"Such a Lovely Man" is the eighth episode of the fifth and final series of the period drama Upstairs, Downstairs. It first aired on 26 October 1975 on ITV.

Background
"Such a Lovely Man" was recorded in the studio on 17 and 18 April 1975. John Hawkesworth and Alfred Shaughnessy wished an episode to revolve around Hannah Gordon's character Virginia, and Rosemary Anne Sisson wrote "Such A Lovely Man". The character of Sir Guy Paynter was inspired by Sir Philip Sassoon, who was the Conservative Member of Parliament for Hythe from 1912 until his death in 1939, and cousin of Siegfried Sassoon.

Cast
Gordon Jackson - Hudson
Hannah Gordon - Virginia Bellamy
Angela Baddeley - Mrs Bridges
David Langton - Richard Bellamy
Jean Marsh - Rose
Robert Hardy - Sir Guy Paynter
Joan Benham - Lady Prudence Fairfax 
Simon Williams - James Bellamy
Christopher Beeny - Edward
Gareth Hunt - Frederick
Jenny Tomasin - Ruby
Polly Adams - Mrs. Polly Merivale
Jacqueline Tong - Daisy
John Normington - Herbert Turner
Leonard Kavanagh - Parsons
Steve Ismay - Footman (uncredited)

Plot
It is summer 1925, and Richard wants the soon to be vacant post of Under-Secretary of State for Foreign Affairs.  He thinks that Sir Guy Paynter, a wealthy and influential industrialist who is also a bachelor, would be able to use his influence to help Richard obtain the post. Virginia agrees, and invites Sir Guy to lunch. However, the lunch ends abruptly when Sir Guy makes a comment regarding death by firing squad for cowardice, not knowing that Virginia's son Michael was court-martialed for such an offence, but reprimanded, sent back into action, and killed. A few days later, Sir Guy sends flowers to Virginia to apologise, and he then takes her to a luncheon. As a thank you, he gives her a signed first edition of Browning's poems.

Virginia then agrees to attend a weekend at Shelburne while Richard is in Paris. Richard tells James that he does not mind Virginia spending time with Sir Guy, but warns him that he is not the "marrying kind". On the Sunday night, all the other guests leave, leaving Sir Guy and Virginia alone. Virginia then drops hints about the Foreign Office post. Shortly after, the gossip columns of the newspapers are filled with rumours about the pair. Richard then asks Virginia not to see so much of him, and Virginia then turns down Sir Guy's invitation to holiday with him. He then comes round and asks for the Browning book back, saying he lent it to her. Moments later, Richard arrives and says he has been offered the post of Under-Secretary of State for Foreign Affairs by Stanley Baldwin. Baldwin had received a note from Sir Guy recommending someone else, saying Richard was too old, and this made Baldwin decide on Richard as he does not like people being in Sir Guy's pocket.

Meanwhile, Ruby answers a newspaper advert for pen pals, and she chooses to write to a Herbert Turner, a 35-year-old post office clerk who lives with his parents in Balham. They soon go to the cinema, and Hudson and Mrs Bridges invite him round for Sunday tea. A few weeks after first meeting, Turner asks Ruby to marry him, but she turns him down, partly because he does not look enough like Rudolph Valentino.

References

Upstairs, Downstairs (series 5) episodes
1975 British television episodes
Fiction set in 1925